Eupithecia phaeocausta is a moth of the family Geometridae. It was first described by Edward Meyrick in 1899. It is endemic to the Hawaiian island of Molokai.

It is a small, dark, narrow-winged, obscurely marked species.

References

External links

phaeocausta
Endemic moths of Hawaii
Moths described in 1899
Biota of Molokai